Events from the year 1863 in the United Kingdom.

Incumbents
 Monarch – Victoria
 Prime Minister – Henry John Temple, 3rd Viscount Palmerston (Liberal)
 Parliament – 18th

Events
 8 January – Yorkshire County Cricket Club is founded at the Adelphi Hotel in Sheffield.
 10 January – the first section of the London Underground Railway opens to the public (Paddington to Farringdon Street).
 7 February – HMS Orpheus sinks attempting to enter Manukau Harbour in New Zealand with the loss of 189 lives.
 25 February – William Thomson enthroned as Archbishop of York.
 2 March – Clapham Junction railway station opens in London.
 10 March – marriage of Albert Edward, Prince of Wales (later Edward VII) to Princess Alexandra of Denmark (later Queen Alexandra) at St George's Chapel, Windsor Castle.
 27 May – Broadmoor Criminal Lunatic Asylum at Crowthorne receives its first patients.
 4 June – the Eton Boating Song is first performed.
 15–17 August – Bombardment of Kagoshima: Royal Navy bombards the town of Kagoshima in Japan in retribution after the Namamugi Incident of 1862.
 20 August – Ladies' London Emancipation Society established as an abolitionist group in support of the Union (American Civil War) by Clementia Taylor at Aubrey House.
 23 October – Ffestiniog Railway in North Wales introduces steam locomotives into general service, the first time this has been done anywhere in the world on a public railway of such a narrow gauge.
 26 October – the Football Association is founded at the Freemasons' Tavern in Long Acre, London.
 8 December – the Football Association laws are agreed.
 10 December  – Tom King, Heavyweight Champion of England, wins the last major bare-knuckle boxing match in England, against the American John C. Heenan at Wadhurst, East Sussex.
 19 December
 linoleum patented.
 the first game is played under the new Football Association rules at Mortlake between Ebenezer Morley's Barnes Club and Richmond F.C., ending in a goalless draw.

Undated
 Before 30 March – the government rejects the Greek Assembly's choice of The Prince Alfred as the successor to the deposed Otto of Greece.
 The case of Byrne v Boadle introduces the doctrine of res ipsa loquitur into English tort law.
 Richard Owen publishes the first description of a fossilised bird, Archaeopteryx.
 A scarlet fever epidemic causes over 30,000 deaths.
 The Chōshū Five leave Japan secretly to study at University College London, part of the ending of sakoku.
 Beginning of Second Anglo-Ashanti war.

Football Clubs formed
 Stoke City F.C.
 Wrexham F.C.

Publications
 Henry Walter Bates's work The Naturalist on the River Amazons.
 Charles Kingsley's children's novel The Water Babies (complete in book form).
 Charles Lyell's work Geological Evidences of the Antiquity of Man, endorsing the views of Charles Darwin.
 Mrs Oliphant's novel Salem Chapel, first of The Chronicles of Carlingford (in book form).
 Ouida's novel Held in Bondage.

Births
 17 January – David Lloyd George, Prime Minister (died 1945)
 11 March – Andrew Stoddart, sportsman (died 1915)
 27 March – Henry Royce, automobile pioneer (died 1933)
 5 April – Victoria, Marchioness of Milford Haven, member of the Royal Family (died 1950)
 18 April – Linton Hope, Olympic yachtsman and yacht and aircraft designer (died 1920)
 15 May – Frank Hornby, inventor, businessman and politician (died 1936)
 17 May – Charles Robert Ashbee, designer (died 1942)
 27 May – Arthur Mold, cricketer (died 1921)
 13 June – Lucy, Lady Duff-Gordon, fashion designer (died 1942)
 19 June – John Goodall, footballer (died 1942)
 6 July – Reginald McKenna, Chancellor of the Exchequer 1915–1916 (died 1943)
 21 July – C. Aubrey Smith, actor and cricketer (died 1948 in Beverly Hills)
 13 September – Arthur Henderson, politician, recipient of the Nobel Peace Prize (died 1935)
 16 October – Austen Chamberlain, statesman, recipient of the Nobel Peace Prize (died 1937)
 17 December – Violet Bland, suffragette (died 1940)

Deaths
 6 January – Harriet Gouldsmith, landscape painter and etcher (born 1787)
 9 March – John Gully, sportsman and politician (born 1783)
 13 April – Sir George Cornewall Lewis, statesman (born 1806)
 14 August – Colin Campbell, 1st Baron Clyde, soldier (born 1792)
 24 June – Sir George Elliot, admiral (born 1784)
 17 September – Charles Robert Cockerell, architect, archaeologist and writer (born 1788)
 26 September – Frederick William Faber, poet, hymnodist, theologian and Catholic convert (born 1814)
 6 October – Frances Milton Trollope, novelist and writer (born 1779)
 8 October – Richard Whately, theologian and archbishop (born 1787)
 28 October – William Cubitt, building and civil engineering contractor and politician (born 1791)
 24 December – William Makepeace Thackeray, novelist (born 1811)
 29 December – Joseph John Scoles, Catholic architect (born 1798)

See also
 1863 in Scotland

References

 
Years of the 19th century in the United Kingdom